The Mociu is a left tributary of the river Fizeș in Romania. It flows into the Fizeș near Geaca.

References

Rivers of Romania
Rivers of Cluj County